Charles Cecil Cope Jenkinson, 3rd Earl of Liverpool  (29 May 1784 – 3 October 1851), styled The Honourable Charles Jenkinson between 1786 and 1828, was a British politician.

Background
Liverpool was the son of Charles Jenkinson, 1st Earl of Liverpool, by his second wife Catherine, daughter of Sir Cecil Bishopp, 6th Baronet, and the younger half-brother of Prime Minister Robert Jenkinson, 2nd Earl of Liverpool. He was educated at Charterhouse School and Christ Church, Oxford.

Between school and university he was placed as a rating (at his father's insistence) in the Royal Navy until a mutiny in 1797 led to him fleeing his ship, HMS Pomone. During the Napoleonic Wars, he was a cornet in the Surrey Yeomanry in 1803 and later served as a volunteer in the Austrian Army at the Battle of Austerlitz in 1805. In 1810, he was lieutenant-colonel of the Cinque Ports militia.

In 1807, he inherited the Pitchford Hall estate in Shropshire following the death of Adam Ottley (the last of his family's male line).

Political career
The Hon. Charles Jenkinson, as he was then, was elected Member of Parliament for Sandwich in 1807, a seat he held until 1812, and then sat for Bridgnorth from 1812 to 1818, and for East Grinstead from 1818 to 1828. He held office under the Duke of Portland as Under-Secretary of State for the Home Department from 1807 to 1809 and under Spencer Perceval as Under-Secretary of State for War and the Colonies from 1809 to 1810, but did not serve in his brother's 1812 to 1827 Tory administration. Liverpool succeeded in the earldom of Liverpool in 1828 on the death of his elder brother and took his seat in the House of Lords. In 1841 he was invested a member of the Privy Council and appointed Lord Steward of the Household in the government of Sir Robert Peel, a post he held until 1846.

Family
On 19 July 1810, Jenkinson married Julia Evelyn Medley Shuckburgh-Evelyn, daughter of Sir George Shuckburgh-Evelyn, 6th Baronet, and Julia Annabella Evelyn. The couple had had three daughters:
Lady Catherine Julia Jenkinson (23 July 1811 – 5 December 1877); married Col. Francis Venables-Vernon-Harcourt, son of the Most Rev. Edward Venables-Vernon-Harcourt and Lady Anne Leveson-Gower; the couple had no children.
Lady Selina Charlotte Jenkinson (3 July 1812 – 24 September 1883); married, firstly, on 15 August 1833, William Wentworth-Fitzwilliam, Viscount Milton (1812–1835), with whom she had one child: Hon. Mary Selina Charlotte Fitzwilliam (9 January 1836 – 4 January 1899), who later married Henry Portman, 2nd Viscount Portman. Lady Selina married, secondly, on 28 August 1845, as his second wife, George Savile Foljambe (4 June 1800 – 18 December 1869), with whom she had four children:
Cecil George Savile Foljambe (7 November 1846 – 23 March 1907); later the 1st Earl of Liverpool (of the 2nd creation).
Caroline Frederica Foljambe (died 20 October 1895).
Elizabeth Anne Foljambe (died 2 January 1930).
Frances Mary Foljambe (died 25 January 1921).
Lady Louisa Harriet Jenkinson (28 March 1814 – 5 February 1887); married John Cotes, son of John Cotes and Lady Maria Grey, a daughter of George Grey, 5th Earl of Stamford; they had two sons.

Julia died in April 1814, shortly after the birth of their youngest child, Louisa. Jenkinson remained a widower until his death in October 1851, aged 67.

In 1828, he inherited the Jenkinson baronetcy, the barony of Hawkesbury and the earldom of Liverpool at the death of his older half-brother, the former prime minister. On his own death, the barony and the earldom became extinct, but the baronetcy (created in 1661) survived, and was passed on to a cousin.

The barony was revived in 1893 in favour of Liverpool's grandson, the Liberal politician Cecil Foljambe, the son of Liverpool's second daughter Lady Selina and her husband George Foljambe. In 1905, the earldom was also revived in favour of Lord Hawkesbury.

References

External links 
 

1784 births
1851 deaths
People educated at Charterhouse School
3rd Earl of Liverpool
Members of the Privy Council of the United Kingdom
Jenkinson, Charles
Politicians awarded knighthoods
Jenkinson, Charles
Jenkinson, Charles
Jenkinson, Charles
Jenkinson, Charles
Jenkinson, Charles
Liverpool, E3
Knights Grand Cross of the Order of the Bath
Charles
People educated at Whitgift School
Younger sons of earls